Cryptolechia rostriformis is a moth in the family Depressariidae. It was described by Wang in 2006. It is found in Fujian, China.

The length of the forewings is 16–17.5 mm. The forewings are black with scattered ochreous-yellow scales, the costal margin with an ochreous-yellow spot halfway and at one-sixth and a third ochreous-yellow patch extending from the end of the cell at the middle to before the tornus. The hindwings are black.

Etymology
The specific name refers to the shape of the uncus and is derived from Latin rostriform (shaped like a beak).

References

Moths described in 2006
Cryptolechia (moth)